The flag of Sabaragamuwa Province was adopted for the Sabaragamuwa Province of Sri Lanka in 1987.

Symbolism
The flag of the Sabaragamuwa is a dark red flag boarded by yellow edges, like the Sri Lankan Flag it has four yellow bo leaves in the corners and in the middle is a lion holding a whip like object, there are also a sun and a moon either side of the lion.

See also
 Flag of Sri Lanka
 List of Sri Lankan flags

References

External links
 Sabaragamuwa Provincial Council
 Flagspot
 Sri Lanka.Asia

Sabaragamuwa Province
Sabaragamuwa Province
Sabaragamuwa Province
Flags displaying animals